Neufang Kulturfabrik was a live music venue in Saarbrücken, Germany. Originally opened as a brewery in 1815, it is now a disco club. Some of the artists that performed at the venue include Dio, Dream Theater, The Kinks and Eloy.

References

External links
 

Former music venues in Germany
1815 establishments in Germany
Commercial buildings completed in 1815
Buildings and structures in Saarbrücken